Andrew Tucker (born 25 December 1968) is a South African former footballer who played at both professional and international levels as a defender. Tucker played club football for Hellenic and SuperSport United; he also earned nine caps for the South African national side between 1994 and 1995. He was part of the squad that won the 1996 African Cup of Nations.

External links

1968 births
Living people
South African soccer players
South Africa international soccer players
1996 African Cup of Nations players
Hellenic F.C. players
SuperSport United F.C. players
Association football defenders
White South African people